Awwad S. Alawwad (Arabic: عواد العواد; born 11 April 1972) is a Saudi politician who has served as minister of culture and information of the Kingdom of Saudi Arabia since April 2017, and as the Ambassador of Saudi Arabia to Germany from October 2015 to April 2017. Alawwad is the former head of the Saudi Human Rights Commission appointed by royal decree with the rank of minister in August 2019. In September 2022,  Alawwad has been relieved from his post as head of Human Rights Commission and has been appointed as advisor at the Saudi Royal Court.

Education and personal life
Dr. Alawwad received a Bachelor of Law from King Saud University in Riyadh in 1993, the M.A. in Banking Law from Boston University Law School in 1996. He obtained a Ph.D. in Financial Market Law from University of Warwick Law School in 2000.
 
A 2005 Eisenhower Fellow, Dr. Alawwad has published a series of academic articles concerning investment and economy, and sat on the advisory board of the Saudi Economic Journal. He has completed the Harvard University Program for Executives, and multiple other internationally accredited programmes.

Alawwad is married and has three children, and lives with his family in Riyadh.

Political career

Ministry of Culture and Information 
Dr. Alawwad was appointed on April 22, 2017, to lead the Ministry of Culture and Information. The Minister's primary mandate is to revitalize the culture and media industries at home, support government communications abroad and strengthen Saudi Arabia's cultural relations around the world.

Since coming to the post, Dr. Alawwad has spearheaded the formation of a supreme committee tasked with the development of the Saudi Broadcasting Corporation's television and radio stations, under the jurisdiction of the General Authority for Radio and Television.

Dr. Alawwad has guided the campaign to promote Saudi literary clubs and societies; established a permanent media center on the Southern Border to support media liaison and visits with armed forces personnel; and supported the development of the Digital Media Index in the Middle East, amongst other initiatives.

Ambassador to Germany 
Dr. Alawwad served as Saudi Arabia's Ambassador Extraordinary and Plenipotentiary to Germany for two years since October 2015 to April 2017.

Other governmental roles 
Dr. Alawwad previously served as an adviser for economic and financial affairs in the Office of the Crown Prince (2013), as a consultant for the Governor of Riyadh and as Vice Governor for Investment Affairs at Saudi Arabian General Investment Authority – SAGIA (2003).

During his tenure, SAGIA established a more liberal ecosystem for investment in Saudi Arabia. It implemented the Investment Environment Obstacles Program, designed to identify and resolve barriers to foreign investment, and promote an open and transparent environment in business within the Kingdom. Dr. Alawwad was responsible for establishing the National Competitiveness Centre, which spearheaded the national ‘10 by 10’ program to establish Saudi Arabia as one of the Top 10 most competitive economies globally.

As part of these efforts, Alawwad chaired the Saudi negotiation team for bilateral investment treaties and was acting leader of the Saudi team overseeing disputes elevated to the WTO. Furthermore, he represented Saudi Arabia on the OECD-MENA Committee on Investment and Arab Investment Promotion Association. He was the deputy chief of the joint Swiss-Saudi commission and Russian-Saudi commission.

Alawwad was also appointed as the chairman of the board of The National Center for Performance Measurement “Adaa" in 2020. Adaa, an independent government entity, is established to measure the performance of public entities in Saudi Arabia to help achieve the kingdom's Vision 2030. 

Alawwad's first job in the government was at the Saudi Arabian Monetary Authority (SAMA) where he was head of financial studies and banking supervision at the Banking Institute.

He also served as a Member of the Saudi Government's Anti-Trust Committee, The Commission for Resolution of Commercial Papers Disputes (United States/Saudi Arabia strategic dialogue), The Saudi American Investment and Trade Board, the regional Arab Investment Authorities Committee and the Arab Investment Court.

Agnes Callamard Accusations 
In 2020, Alawwad was uncovered as allegedly having twice threatened the life of outgoing United Nations investigator Agnes Callamard who told The Guardian on that a senior Saudi official had threatened to have her “taken care of” at a “high-level” meeting if she wasn't kept in check following her damning findings into MBS direct connection to the murder of Khashoggi. The UN later confirmed to Reuters on Wednesday that Callamard's remarks were accurate.

Alawwad has denied the allegations and has stated that he rejects "this suggestion in the strongest terms” and that he never “would have desired or threatened any harm upon a UN-appointed individual or anyone in that matter”. He added: “I am disheartened that anything I have said could be interpreted as a threat”.

References

21st-century Saudi Arabian politicians
1972 births
Ambassadors of Saudi Arabia to Germany
Government ministers of Saudi Arabia
Living people
Saudi Arabian journalists